Private Circus was the Paris-based contemporary music group created in 1988 and directed by Canadian composer Scott MacLeay. The group worked for a ten-year period exploring hybrid musical forms influenced from multiple sources including cabaret, contemporary electronic music, rock and opera. The group's members varied greatly from project to project with Scott MacLeay (keyboards / programming / vocals) and soprano Christel Desjardin constituting the permanent core. 
Private Circus recorded two CDs on the Sordide Sentimental Label: Les Petities Foules / Small Crowds (1990 Ref: SSCD004) and La Moitié de l'Histoire” (1994 Ref: SSFP99).

References

French experimental music groups